Sorel Airport  is located  in Saint-Robert, Quebec, Canada, southeast of Sorel-Tracy.

References

Registered aerodromes in Montérégie
Transport in Sorel-Tracy